In telecommunication, the term primary channel has the following meanings: 

 The communication channel that is designated as a prime transmission channel and is used as the first choice in restoring priority circuits.  
 In a communications network, the channel that has the highest data rate of all the channels sharing a common interface. 
 The main Television channel of several operated by a broadcaster.

A primary channel may support the transfer of information in one direction only, either direction alternately, or both directions simultaneously.

 On a computer motherboard, it is the first physical connector for an IDE or ATA drive.

Sources

Network architecture